

Colorado state forests

 Colorado State Forest - Jackson County

See also
 List of U.S. National Forests#Colorado

External links
 Colorado State University Forest Service
 Colorado Department of Natural Resources

Colorado
State forests